Caldwell County is a county located in Missouri, United States. As of the 2020 census, the county's population was 9,424. It is part of the Kansas City metropolitan area. Its county seat is Kingston. The county was organized December 29, 1836 and named by Alexander Doniphan to honor John Caldwell, who participated in George Rogers Clark's Native American Campaign of 1786 and was the second Lieutenant Governor of Kentucky.

Caldwell County was originally established as a haven for Mormons, who had been driven from Jackson County in November 1833 and had been refugees in adjacent Clay County since. The county was one of the principal settings of the 1838 Missouri Mormon War, which led to the expulsion of all Latter Day Saints from Missouri, following the issuance of an "extermination order" by then–Governor Lilburn Boggs.

History

Mormon settlement

Caldwell County was originally part of Ray County. The first white settler was Jesse Mann Sr., who settled one-half mile northeast of the public square of Kingston on Shoal Creek in 1831. The early settlers moved back south in 1832 for better protection during the Black Hawk War uprising.

A few Mormon settlers, who had been evicted from Jackson County, Missouri, moved into the county in 1832, and included Jacob Hawn, whose mill on Shoal Creek would become the scene of the bloodiest incident in the Mormon War, known as the Haun's Mill Massacre.

The settlers established Salem, the first town in the county, two miles southeast of Kingston. A larger number of Mormons moved to the county in the fall of 1836. The Missouri General Assembly created Caldwell County in December 1836, with the understanding that it would be dedicated to Mormon settlers. Its county seat was Far West, Missouri. By 1838 Far West reported a population of 4,000.

The major figures of early Mormon history, including Joseph Smith, Hyrum Smith, Brigham Young, John Taylor, Edward Partridge, Sidney Rigdon, Parley P. Pratt and John D. Lee, were included in the migration.

Mormon War
Mormon settlers moved further north into Daviess County, particularly at Adam-ondi-Ahman, after Smith proclaimed that it was the Biblical place where Adam and Eve were banished after leaving the Garden of Eden. He said it would be a gathering place on the Judgement Day. The Mormon War erupted following a skirmish between original Missouri settlers and Mormon settlers in the Gallatin Election Day Battle.

After the Missouri militia was routed in the Battle of Crooked Creek, Governor Lilburn Boggs issued Missouri Executive Order 44 (Mormon Extermination Order) to evict the Mormons from the state. Three days later, a group from Livingston County killed 18 Mormons in the Haun's Mill massacre. Troops laid siege to Far West, where Smith surrendered in October 1838. The settlers agreed to leave; they abandoned Far West and initially regrouped in Quincy, Illinois, for the winter of 1838–39. The following spring, they founded Nauvoo, Illinois.

Following the dissolution of Far West, the county seat was moved to present-day Kingston.

Geography

Adjacent counties
Daviess County (north)
Livingston County (east)
Carroll County (southeast)
Ray County (south)
Clinton County (west)
DeKalb County (northwest)

Major highways
 U.S. Route 36
 Route 13
 Route 116

Demographics

As of the census of 2000, there were 8,969 people, 3,523 households, and 2,501 families residing in the county.  The population density was 8/km2 (21/mi2).  There were 4,493 housing units at an average density of 4/km2 (10/mi2).  The racial makeup of the county was 98.56% White, 0.13% Black or African American, 0.33% Native American, 0.12% Asian, 0.00% Pacific Islander, 0.18% from other races, and 0.67% from two or more races.  0.75% of the population were Hispanic or Latino of any race.

There were 3,523 households, out of which 32.30% had children under the age of 18 living with them, 59.20% were married couples living together, 8.00% had a female householder with no husband present, and 29.00% were non-families. 25.50% of all households were made up of individuals, and 13.00% had someone living alone who was 65 years of age or older.  The average household size was 2.51, and the average family size was 3.04.

In the county, the population was spread out, with 27.10% under the age of 18, 7.10% from 18 to 24, 25.10% from 25 to 44, 23.70% from 45 to 64, and 17.00% who were 65 years of age or older.  The median age was 39 years.  For every 100 females there were 97.60 males.  For every 100 females age 18 and over, there were 93.90 males.

The median income for a household in the county was $31,240, and the median income for a family was $37,087. Males had a median income of $28,710 versus $19,523 for females. The per capita income for the county was $15,343.  11.90% of the population and 9.70% of families were below the poverty line.  Out of the total population, 15.10% of those under the age of 18 and 12.90% of those 65 and older were living below the poverty line.

2020 Census

Education

Public Schools
Braymer C-4 School District – Braymer
Braymer Elementary School (PK-06)
Braymer High School (07-12)
Breckenridge R-I School District – Breckenridge
Breckinridge Elementary School (PK-06)
Breckinridge High School (07-12)
Cowgill R-VI School District – Cowgill
Cowgill Elementary School (Pk-08)
Kingston School District No. 42 – Kingston
Kingston Elementary School (PK-08)
Mirabile C-1 School District – Polo
Mirabile Elementary School (PK-08)
New York R-IV School District – Hamilton
New York Elementary School (K-08)
Polo R-VII School District – Polo
Polo Elementary School (PK-04)
Polo Middle School (05-08)
Polo High School (09-12)
Hamilton R-2 School District - Hamilton,  Missouri

Public libraries
Breckenridge Public Library  
Hamilton Public Library

Politics

Local
The Republican Party controls politics at the local level in Caldwell County. Republicans hold all but one of the elected positions in the county.

State

All of Caldwell County is a part of Missouri's 8th District in the Missouri House of Representatives and is currently represented by Randy Railsback (R-Hamilton).

 

All of Caldwell County is a part of Missouri's 21st District in the Missouri Senate and is currently represented by Denny Hoskins (R-Warrensburg).

Federal
All of Caldwell County is included in Missouri's 6th Congressional District and is currently represented by Sam Graves (R-Tarkio) in the U.S. House of Representatives. Graves was elected to an eleventh term in 2020 over Democratic challenger Gena Ross.

Caldwell County, along with the rest of the state of Missouri, is represented in the U.S. Senate by Josh Hawley (R-Columbia) and Roy Blunt (R-Strafford).

Blunt was elected to a second term in 2016 over then-Missouri Secretary of State Jason Kander.

Missouri presidential preference primaries

2020
The 2020 presidential primaries for both the Democratic and Republican parties were held in Missouri on March 10. On the Democratic side, former Vice President Joe Biden (D-Delaware) both won statewide and carried Caldwell County by a wide margin. Biden went on to defeat President Donald Trump in the general election.

Incumbent President Donald Trump (R-Florida) faced a primary challenge from former Massachusetts Governor Bill Weld, but won both Caldwell County and statewide by overwhelming margins.

2016
The 2016 presidential primaries for both the Republican and Democratic parties were held in Missouri on March 15. Businessman Donald Trump (R-New York) narrowly won the state overall, as well as a plurality of the vote in Caldwell County.

On the Democratic side, former Secretary of State Hillary Clinton (D-New York) won statewide by a small margin, but lost Caldwell County to Senator Bernie Sanders (I-Vermont).

2012
The 2012 Missouri Republican Presidential Primary's results were nonbinding on the state's national convention delegates. Voters in Caldwell County supported former U.S. Senator Rick Santorum (R-Pennsylvania), who finished first in the state at large, but eventually lost the nomination to former Governor Mitt Romney (R-Massachusetts). Delegates to the congressional district and state conventions were chosen at a county caucus, which selected delegations favoring Romney.

2008
In 2008, the Missouri Republican Presidential Primary was closely contested, with Senator John McCain (R-Arizona) prevailing and eventually winning the nomination.

Then-Senator Hillary Clinton (D-New York) received more votes than any candidate from either party in Caldwell County during the 2008 presidential primary. Despite initial reports that Clinton had won Missouri, Barack Obama (D-Illinois), also a Senator at the time, narrowly defeated her statewide and later became that year's Democratic nominee, going on to win the presidency.

Communities

Cities

Braymer
Breckenridge
Cowgill
Hamilton
Kidder
Kingston (county seat)
Polo

Ghost town
Far West

Townships
Caldwell County is divided into 12 townships

 Breckenridge
 Davis
 Fairview
 Gomer
 Grant
 Hamilton
 Kidder
 Kingston
 Lincoln
 Mirabile
 New York
 Rockford

Unincorporated Communities

 Black Oak
 Bonanza
 Catawba
 Gould Farm
 Mirabile
 Nettleton

Notable people
 Colin Brown, former NFL player for the Kansas City Chiefs, Baltimore Ravens, and Buffalo Bills
 Herb Conyers, former professional baseball player for the Cleveland Indians
 Jenny Doan, Quilter for Missouri Star Quilt Company
 Charles J. Hughes Jr., U.S. Senator from Colorado (1909-1911)
 James Kirkpatrick, Missouri Secretary of State (1965-1985) and longest-serving statewide elected official in Missouri history
 Frank B. Klepper, U.S. Representative from Missouri (1905-1907)
 Glen Lukens, prominent Western ceramics artist
 James Cash Penney, founder of  JC Penney
 Mack Wheat, Major League Baseball player
 Zack Wheat, Major League Baseball player

See also
National Register of Historic Places listings in Caldwell County, Missouri

References

Sources

External links

 Caldwell County Website
 Digitized 1930 Plat Book of Caldwell County  from University of Missouri Division of Special Collections, Archives, and Rare Books

 
Missouri counties
Significant places in Mormonism
1836 establishments in Missouri
Populated places established in 1836